These Ones Are Bitter is the second solo-album by American punk rock band Screeching Weasel front man Ben Weasel. It was released in June 2007, and was the first album released for "Mendota Recording Company", Ben Weasel's digital download only record label. On October 23, 2007, it was released physically on CD and vinyl by Edmond Records, and on April 7, 2009, was re-issued by Asian Man Records.

The original release was credited to "Ben Weasel And His Iron String Quartet", however the Asian Man cover credits the album just to Ben Weasel. The Iron String Quartet is actually a trio consisting of Dan Andriano (of Alkaline Trio), Mike Kennerty, and Chris Gaylor (both of the All-American Rejects). Kennerty is also the album's producer.

Track listing
"Let Freedom Ring"
"In A Few Days"
"Got My Number"
"Happy Saturday"
"Sour All Over"
"The First Day of Spring"
"Blue Is The Ocean"
"Affected By You"
"Jeanette"
"Addition By Subtraction"
"Give It Time"
"Summer's Always Gone Too Soon"
"In A Bad Place"
"Only In November"

Personnel
Ben Weasel- vocals
Mike Kennerty- guitar/ producer
Dan Andriano- bass
Chris Gaylor- drums
Cristy Road - artwork

References

2007 albums
Ben Weasel albums